Fast & Furious Presents: Hobbs & Shaw (also known simply as Hobbs & Shaw) is a 2019 American buddy action comedy film directed by David Leitch and written by Chris Morgan and Drew Pearce, from a story by Morgan. It is the first spin-off of the Fast & Furious franchise, and is set following the events of The Fate of the Furious (2017) and before the events of F9 (2021). It stars Dwayne Johnson, Jason Statham, Idris Elba, Vanessa Kirby, Eiza González, Cliff Curtis, and Helen Mirren. In the film, the unlikely pairing of Luke Hobbs (Johnson) and Deckard Shaw (Statham) join Deckard's sister Hattie (Kirby) to take down Brixton Lore (Elba), a cybernetically enhanced terrorist threatening the world with a deadly virus.

Series star and producer Vin Diesel first said in 2015 that possible spin-offs were in early development, and Hobbs & Shaw was officially announced in October 2017. Leitch signed on to direct in April 2018, and Kirby and Elba both joined the cast that July. Principal photography began that September and lasted through January 2019, with filming locations including London, Glasgow, and Kaua'i. The film was subject to controversy after longterm Fast & Furious producer Neal H. Moritz filed a lawsuit against Universal Pictures for breach of oral contract and committing promissory fraud related to his role on Hobbs & Shaw, which was eventually settled in September 2020.

Hobbs & Shaw premiered at the Dolby Theatre in Hollywood on July 13, 2019, was theatrically released in the United States on August 2, 2019, by Universal Pictures. The film received mixed reviews from critics, who praised the chemistry between Johnson and Statham but found it underwhelming when compared to other Fast & Furious films. Hobbs & Shaw grossed $760 million worldwide, becoming the eleventh-highest grossing film of 2019.

Plot
In London, MI6 agent Hattie Shaw and her team attempt to retrieve a programmable supervirus dubbed "Snowflake" from techno-terrorist organization Eteon. Brixton Lore is an ex-MI6 Agent turned Eteon operative with cybernetic implants that allow him to perform superhuman feats. He arrives and kills all the agents except Hattie, who injects the only dose of Snowflake into herself before escaping. Brixton frames Hattie for killing her team and stealing Snowflake, forcing her to go on the run. 

Ex-DSS Agent Luke Hobbs and ex-MI6 Agent Deckard Shaw are informed of the missing virus and reluctantly work together to track it down. After a brief meeting at a CIA black site at the Leadenhall Building, Deckard goes to Hattie's apartment for information, only to get attacked by Eteon operatives. 

Meanwhile Hobbs manages to find Hattie; after a brief scuffle, he brings her to the CIA offices. As Deckard arrives he informs him that she is actually his sister. The office is attacked, and Hattie is taken by Brixton, whom Deckard recognizes as an old colleague-turned-enemy he believes killed by him. Hobbs and Deckard pursue and rescue Hattie, and during an ensuing car chase, evade Brixton, who crashes into a double-decker bus. However, Brixton frames all three as traitors via Eteon's control of global news media. 

The three locate Snowflake's creator, Professor Andreiko, where they learn he purposed it to efficiently deliver vaccines, and to prevent Eteon from using it to eradicate humanity, Hattie, while the virus is still dormant, must either be cremated or have the virus removed with a specialized extraction device, which is located in Eteon's special facility in Chernobyl, Ukraine. 

Although Hobbs was briefly detained due to Deckard making his fake alias "Mike Oxmaul," the three manage to travel to Moscow. After rendezvousing with Deckard's former flame Margarita to rearm in Moscow, the three infiltrate the facility. They retrieve the device before escaping in a truck during the facility's destruction, though Andreiko is killed and the device is damaged. 

Hobbs takes Deckard and Hattie to his childhood home in Samoa to visit his estranged brother Jonah, a talented mechanic, to repair the device and lay low before confronting Brixton's forces again. Hobbs has a tense reunion with his family as he turned his father in to the authorities prior, but their mother convinces Jonah to help. 

The makeshift battalion prepares for Eteon's arrival, disabling the weapons used by Eteon's team by temporarily shutting down their authorization code, and setting up a variety of traps around the island. Jonah successfully repairs the device and starts the virus extraction just as Brixton and his army arrive. 

In the ensuing battle, the Samoans engage and easily overpower Brixton's reinforcements while suffering minimal casualties. Brixton recaptures Hattie with a helicopter; however, Hobbs, Deckard, and the Samoans bring the aircraft down with several custom trucks. 

Working together, Hobbs and Deckard alternate their attacks to defeat Brixton, who is remotely terminated afterward by Eteon's unseen director. The director sends a message claiming to know Hobbs and intending to persuade him and the Shaw siblings, while they promise to find the director; the group then celebrates their victory. 

In post-credits scenes, Hobbs brings his daughter to meet their extended family in Samoa; Deckard and Hattie are implied to bust their mother out of prison; and Hobbs receives a call from his partner, Locke, who has broken into a laboratory and discovered a more threatening virus. Hobbs also secretly has the London police set on Deckard in retaliation for the "Mike Oxmaul" prank, which Hobbs told the police that Deckard's name was "Hugh Janus".

Cast

In addition, Lori Pelenise Tuisano portrays Sefina Hobbs, the mother of Luke Hobbs and matriarch of the Hobbs family. Rob Delaney appears as CIA agent Loeb while the film's director David Leitch makes a cameo appearance as an Eteon helicopter pilot. Ryan Reynolds and Kevin Hart make uncredited cameo appearances as CIA agent Victor Locke and Air Marshal Dinkley. The Eteon Director, a role Keanu Reeves was in negotiations for, does not physically appear in the film, but is also voiced by Reynolds in a dual role, under the pseudonym "Champ Nightingale".

Production

Development
In November 2015, Vin Diesel announced in an interview with Variety that potential spin-offs for the Fast & Furious series were in the early stages of development. In October 2017, Universal Pictures announced a spin-off film centered around characters Luke Hobbs and Deckard Shaw, and set a release date of July 26, 2019, with Chris Morgan returning to write the script. Variety reported that Shane Black was being considered to direct the film. In February 2018, Deadpool 2 director David Leitch entered talks to direct the film. In April 2018, Leitch was confirmed as the director for the film and added David Scheunemann as a production designer.

Casting
In July 2018, Vanessa Kirby was cast in the film to play an MI6 agent and Shaw's sister, along with Idris Elba as the main villain in the film. In October 2018, Eddie Marsan joined the cast of the film, and in November 2018, Eiza González was added as well. In January 2019, Johnson revealed that his cousin and professional wrestler Roman Reigns would appear in the film as Hobbs's brother. Additionally, he announced that Cliff Curtis, Josh Mauga, and John Tui would portray other brothers of Hobbs. Helen Mirren was also confirmed to be reprising her role from The Fate of the Furious.

Filming
Principal photography began on September 10, 2018, in London, England. Dwayne Johnson joined the production two weeks later, on September 24, 2018, after he had wrapped filming Jungle Cruise. Most filming was done at Shepperton Studios and Leavesden Studios. In October, filming moved to Glasgow, Scotland, to recreate London. Filming also took place in late 2018 at Eggborough power station in North Yorkshire, and in Farnborough, Hampshire. The Hawaiian island of Kaua'i was used as a stand-in for Samoa for the film's third act. Cinematographer Jonathan Sela shot the film with Arri Alexa SXT and Alexa Mini digital cameras and Hawk Class-X anamorphic lenses. Production officially wrapped on January 27, 2019. Scroggins Aviation Mockup & Effects was hired to supply a UH-60 Black Hawk (s/n 79-23354) in the film. Scroggins made modification to the UH-60 and worked with the art department to supply it with a digital cockpit panel.

Post-production

The visual effects were provided by DNEG, Cantina Creative, The Third Floor, RISE FX and Framestore, supervised by Mike Brazelton and Kyle McCulloch, and produced by Dan Glass. DNEG is the main vendor for this project, with a total VFX shots of around 1,000. They worked on the big action sequences in London, Chernobyl and a part of the climatic Samoan chase. The London chase sequence consists of blue screen environments and car interiors, with CGI reflections on the McLaren exterior. There are few head replacements and full CGI character doubles. For the latter, they were created and animated from reference photography of the main actors. The same method was applied for the McLaren and the Brixton bikes. Idris Elba was enhanced to give him super-human abilities. Motion graphics were used to make a sort of heads up display of data and stats called the Brixton vision, to help him in the fights. For the Chernobyl action sequence, the environments were made from Lidar scanning, texture reference of a decommissioned coal power plant used for the production shootings. Then, they extended parts of the facility and modified weather conditions. Drones were fully created and animated. Explosions were created too. Finally, they handled the Samoa chopper destruction.

Framestore handled 264 VFX shots for the project, mostly the 3rd-act chase sequence. They photographed the Nā Pali Coast on the North Side of Kauai, Hawaii before and during the main shoot. Then, they used their photography to be photo scanned and transferred into a CGI version of the coastline. They had to fit the CGI environment to the shoot location. They also created CGI cliffs, CGI foliage and some scattered rocks on flatter areas or ledges. Finally for the creation of the environments, they used many reference plate shots for the blue screens. They also photographed, photo scanned, modeled and animated all the vehicles portrayed in that sequence, including the Peterbilt, the M37, the Ratrod and the Black Hawk. The latter was cyber scanned by ClearAngle. They adapted the CGI vehicles with the environment, including the lighting, tillable textures and painting scratches. Finally, they enhanced the explosions and car crashes with some debris, fire elements and craters.

Music

In May 2019, Film Music Reporter announced that Tyler Bates would compose the film's score. The first single of the soundtrack is "Getting Started" written by Kyle Williams aka producer Willyecho (created through the series Songland for Aloe Blacc), and performed by American singer-songwriter Aloe Blacc and rapper JID. Idris Elba himself has produced a track featuring Cypress Hill's B-Real titled "Even If I Die"; the Hybrid remix of the track appears both in the film and during the end credits. The film's soundtrack also features numerous artists including Logic, Yungblud, A$ton Wyld, Ohana Bam, and The Heavy.

Marketing

The first poster was released on January 31, 2019. The first trailer was released on February 1, 2019, and a TV spot was aired during Super Bowl LIII, on February 3, 2019. A second trailer was released on April 18, 2019. The final trailer was released on June 28, 2019.

Release

Theatrical
The film had its premiere at the Dolby Theatre in the Hollywood district of Los Angeles, California on July 13, 2019. The film was theatrically released in the United States on August 2, 2019, after being moved from its previous date of July 26, 2019. The film began international rollout on July 31, 2019, and was released in China on August 23, 2019. The release is in 2D, Dolby Cinema, and IMAX. A RealD 3D conversion for the film was originally planned to release but was later cancelled. However, the planned conversion was done by Stereo D.

Lawsuit
In October 2018, Fast & Furious producer Neal H. Moritz filed a lawsuit against Universal Pictures for breach of oral contract and committing promissory fraud, after the distributor removed him as lead producer on Hobbs & Shaw. In May 2019, it was revealed that Universal had dropped Moritz from all future Fast & Furious installments. His lawsuit was settled in September 2020, and Moritz would later return to the series with F9.

Home media
Fast & Furious Presents: Hobbs & Shaw was released on Digital HD on October 15, 2019, and on DVD, Blu-ray, and Ultra HD Blu-ray on November 5, 2019, by Universal Pictures Home Entertainment.

Reception

Box office
Hobbs & Shaw grossed $174 million in the United States and Canada, and $586 million in other territories, for a worldwide total of $760 million. Deadline Hollywood calculated the net profit of the film to be $84million, when factoring together all expenses and revenues.

In the United States and Canada, the film was projected to gross $60–65 million from 4,253 theaters in its opening weekend, while some insiders predicted it could exceed $70 million. The film made $23.7 million on its first day, including $5.8 million from Thursday night previews, the highest amount for both Johnson and Statham outside the main Fast & Furious series. It went on to debut to $60 million over the weekend, finishing first at the box office. Similar to the main Fast & Furious films, Hobbs & Shaw had a diverse audience, with audience demographics being 40% Caucasian, 27% Hispanic, 20% African American and 13% Asian. The film dropped 58% in its second weekend to $25.3 million, remaining in first, before another Universal film Good Boys replaced it in the third week.

In other territories, the film was projected to open to around $125 million from 54 countries, for a worldwide debut of $195 million. The film made $24.9 million from its first two days of international release. In its Chinese opening weekend the film made $102 million, grossing below projections but nevertheless being the second highest-grossing weekend of 2019 behind Avengers: Endgame.

Critical response
The website's critical consensus reads, "Hobbs & Shaw doesn't rev as high as the franchise's best installments, but gets decent mileage out of its well-matched stars and over-the-top action sequences." On Metacritic, the film has a weighted average score of 60 out of 100, based on 54 critics, indicating "mixed or average reviews". Audiences polled by CinemaScore gave the film an average grade of "A−" on an A+ to F scale, while those at PostTrak gave it an average four out of five stars.

Writing for Variety, Peter Debruge wrote, "Fan favorites Dwayne Johnson and Jason Statham milk the friction between their characters while teaming up to save the world in this gratuitously over-the-top spinoff." Eric Kohn of IndieWire gave the film a "B−" and stated, "Strip away the meandering exposition and Hobbs & Shaw is an old-school screwball comedy that just happens to feature two major action stars." Conversely, the Chicago Sun-Timess Richard Roeper gave the film 1.5 out of 4 stars, writing, "In case of bad-movie emergency, break glass. Over the two-hour-plus running time of the painfully long, exceedingly tedious, consistently unimaginative and quite dopey Hobbs & Shaw, I counted some 13 instances in which humans and/or vehicles went crashing through panes of glass."

Accolades

Sequel
In November 2019, producer Hiram Garcia confirmed that all creatives involved have intentions in developing a sequel, with conversations regarding the project ongoing. By March 2020, Johnson confirmed that a sequel was officially in development, while the creative team was not yet decided. Garcia confirmed the project was in active development a month later, citing the box office performance of Hobbs & Shaw, and announced Morgan would return to write. Johnson expressed excitement for the sequel that same month, stating that it will introduce new characters.

In November 2021, Johnson revealed that he had developed an original idea for the sequel, which he described as "the antithesis of Fast & Furious" and that he presented the concept to Universal Pictures chairwoman Donna Langley, as well as Garcia and Morgan. He elaborated the sequel would take immediate precedence over the rest of his film-slate, and further teased its development will progress after he completes the holiday-action film Red One (2023). Later that month, Garcia confirmed that work on the screenplay is ongoing, calling the film "very ambitious".

In December 2022, Universal Pictures producer Kelly McCormack revealed the film's production has been stalled, stating "we would love to [make the sequel]. There's no conversations at this time".

References

Further reading

External links 

 
 

2019 films
2010s action adventure films
American action adventure films
American buddy action films
2010s English-language films
Fast & Furious mass media
Cyborg films
Drone films
Film spin-offs
Films about infectious diseases
Films about terrorism in Europe
Films about the Secret Intelligence Service
Films directed by David Leitch
Films produced by Chris Morgan
Films produced by Dwayne Johnson
Films produced by Jason Statham
Films scored by Tyler Bates
Films set in Chernobyl (city)
Films set in London
Films set in Los Angeles
Films set in Moscow
Films set in Samoa
Films set on airplanes
Films shot in England
Films shot in Glasgow
Films shot in Hawaii
Films shot in London
Seven Bucks Productions films
Techno-thriller films
Films with screenplays by Chris Morgan
Films with screenplays by Drew Pearce
IMAX films
Universal Pictures films
Fast & Furious films
2010s American films